is a Japanese economist, economic analyst, former senior economist at Nomura Research Institute, and chairman of the Three-Nations Research Institute. He was arrested for sexual offenses in 2004 and 2006.

Life and career
He entered the University of Tokyo in 1979 and majored in economics. Uekusa joined Nomura Research Institute in April 1983 after graduating from the University of Tokyo in March 1983. He became a researcher at the Fiscal and Monetary Policy Institute of the Ministry of Finance in July 1985, an assistant professor at the Economic Research Institute of Kyoto University in June 1991, an honorary fellow at the Hoover Institution of Stanford University in October 1993, a senior economist at Nomura Research Institute in April 2002, and a professor at the Graduate School of Waseda University from April 2003 until his retirement in April 2004. He then founded the Three-Nations Research Institute and became its president on April 1, 2005. In April 2006, he made a career comeback in an academic position as a visiting professor at the Graduate School of Nagoya University of Commerce & Business in Nagoya. He lectured on "national economic strategy" until his arrest in September of that year.

He appeared as a commentator on television programs such as Fuji TV's morning show Tokudane!.

Criminal charges

On April 8, 2004, Uekusa was arrested for trying to look up a high school girl's skirt with his hand mirror on an escalator at Shinagawa Station of the East Japan Railway Company in Minato, Tokyo. Immediately after his arrest, Uekusa admitted his guilt and apologized. He was dismissed from his position as a professor on May 7, 2004 over the arrest, although he denied the charges.

His trial began at the Tokyo District Court on March 23, 2005, and the presiding judge fined him 500,000 yen and confiscated his hand mirror. He insisted that it was an "unfair verdict" and intended to appeal. However, the verdict became final when he failed to file an appeal by the deadline of April 6, 2005.

Uekusa was arrested again at Keikyū Kamata Station on September 13, 2006, at around 10:10 p.m. for molesting a girl on a Keikyu train. On September 27, 2006, Nagoya University of Commerce & Business announced that it had dismissed him from his duties as a visiting professor. Uekusa maintained his innocence, saying that he was drunk when he was arrested and did not remember what happened that night. He was charged with chikan on October 4, 2006.

On January 22, 2007, Uekusa was released from Tokyo Detention House on bail of 6 million yen.

On October 16, 2007, Uekusa was sentenced to four months in prison by Tokyo District Court Presiding Judge Shō Kamisaka. He repeated his earlier denials, but fabric traces on his suit and witness testimony were enough to convince the court that he had groped under the victim's skirt. In handing down the sentence, Kamisaka noted that "The court cannot anticipate that the accused will be rehabilitated" on his own recognizance. Uekusa vowed to appeal, saying in a statement that "the truth will always prevail." On April 16, 2008, the Tokyo High Court upheld a four-month prison sentence for Uekusa. On June 25, 2009, the Supreme Court rejected Uekusa's final appeal.

In an interview with journalist Benjamin Fulford on June 19, 2008, he stated that he was arrested as part of a national politics investigation after criticizing the economic policies of Junichiro Koizumi and Heizō Takenaka on a television program.

Bibliography
. Iwanami Shoten Publishing, Tokyo 1992, 
 with Kentaro Hasegawa. Gattkyusha, Tokyo 1993, 
. Kodansha, Tokyo 1999, 
. Iwanami Shoten, Tokyo 2001, 
 with Taichi Sakaiya and Takeaki Kariya. Toyo keizai shinposha, Tokyo 2003, 
. Shisei Bungaku, Tokyo 2006 
. Epushiron Publishing Project, Tokyo 2007, 
 with Takahiko Soejima. Shodensha, Tokyo 2009 
. Asukashinshya, Tokyo 2010, 
. Seishisha, Tokyo 2011, 
. Asukashinsha, Tokyo 2012, 
 with Takahiko Soejima and Hirohiko Takahashi. Shodensha, Tokyo 2012 
. Businesssha, Tokyo 2013, 
 with Ukeru Magosaki and Yukio Hatoyama. Asukashinsha, Tokyo 2013, 
. Kodansha, Tokyo 2013, 
. Nihonbungeisha, Tokyo 2013, 
. Businesssha, Tokyo 2013,

References

External links
 

1960 births
Living people
Japanese financial analysts
Japanese prisoners and detainees
Prisoners and detainees of Japan
People convicted of indecent assault
University of Tokyo alumni
Businesspeople from Tokyo
Academic staff of Kyoto University
Academic staff of Waseda University
Academic staff of Nagoya University of Commerce & Business
20th-century Japanese economists
21st-century Japanese economists
21st-century Japanese criminals